Lawn bowls women's pairs B6–8 at the 2022 Commonwealth Games was held at the Victoria Park from July 29 to August 3. A total of 12 athletes from 6 associations participated in the event.

Sectional play
The top four advance to the knockout stage.

Knockout stage

External links
Results

References

Women's pairs B6-8